Astartea aspera, commonly known as rough-stemmed astartea, is a shrub endemic to Western Australia.

It blooms between August and May producing white-pink flowers.

It is found along the south coast on valleys, hills, ridges, river banks and road verges in the Great Southern and Goldfields-Esperance regions of Western Australia where it grows in sandy-loamy-clay soils over limestone or granite.

References

Eudicots of Western Australia
aspera
Endemic flora of Western Australia
Plants described in 1844